Daniel Samohin (born 12 March 1998) is an Israeli figure skater. He is the 2016 World Junior champion, and has won two ISU Challenger Series medals, including a gold medal at the 2015 U.S. International Classic. Samohin is one of the few skaters to have landed two quad jumps in a short program, three quads in a free program, and five quads in one competition. He was a member of the Israeli delegation to the 2018 Winter Olympics in Pyeongchang, South Korea.

Personal life 
Samohin was born on March 12, 1998, in Tel Aviv, Israel, is Jewish, and speaks two languages.  His parents – Irina, a former rhythmic gymnast, and Igor Samohin, a former figure skater who had competed internationally in pairs for the Soviet Union and who as a figure skating coach coached Israel's national team for five years in the 1990s – had arrived in Israel from Russia in 1996. He has a grandfather who lives in Russia, and a grandmother who lives in Israel. His brother, Stanislav, is  years older and competed in figure skating for both Russia and Israel. When he was  years old, Samohin moved with his mother to California in the United States, joining the rest of the family, who had moved earlier. His hometown is San Diego, California.

Skating career 
Samohin began skating in 2003. His club is Ice Holon Israel. His father is his coach, and his mother has worked as his choreographer, as have Olga Volozhinskaia and Nikolai Morozov.

2013–14 season 
Samohin made his international debut in September 2013 at an ISU Junior Grand Prix (JGP) event in Mexico. He ranked sixth in the short program, and placed third in the free skate and was awarded the bronze medal, outscoring Canada's Nam Nguyen by 1.85 points. He finished fourth at his second JGP assignment, in Ostrava, Czech Republic. In March 2014, he finished 12th at the 2014 World Junior Championships in Sofia, Bulgaria, having placed 17th in the short program and 10th in the free.

2014–15 season
During the 2014 JGP series, Samohin placed 8th in Ljubljana, Slovenia and 16th in Zagreb, Croatia. In September 2014, he debuted on the senior international level, finishing 11th at the Nebelhorn Trophy, an ISU Challenger Series (CS) event. After placing fourth at another CS event, the Volvo Open Cup, he took silver at a regular senior international, the Tallinn Trophy, behind fellow Israeli Oleksii Bychenko. Ranked 12th in the short and 5th in the free, he finished 8th overall at the 2015 World Junior Championships in Tallinn, Estonia.

2015–16 season
Samohin withdrew from a senior Grand Prix event, the 2015 Cup of China, in order to continue competing on the junior level. Competing in September at the Junior Grand Prix in Colorado Springs, Colorado, he placed 7th in the short and second in the free; he won the silver medal, finishing almost 30 points behind Nathan Chen of the United States and 3.49 ahead of Japan's Sota Yamamoto. Later that month, he won his first CS medal, outscoring Keiji Tanaka by 11.33 points to take gold at the U.S. International Classic.

After winning a silver medal at his second JGP event in Logroño, Spain, Samohin qualified for the JGP Final. His second CS medal, silver, came in October at the 2015 Mordovian Ornament, where he scored 1.24 points less than Maxim Kovtun. Samohin finished fifth at the JGP Final. His next event was the 2016 European Figure Skating Championships, where he set a new personal best in the short program and finished 7th overall.

In March, Samohin won a gold medal at the World Junior Championships in Debrecen, Hungary, winning the Single Skating Championship. He ranked 9th in the short program, but moved up to win the title after a personal-best free skate in which he landed three quadruple jumps. Samohin was the first Israeli skater to medal at Junior Worlds, and the first to win an ISU championship.

2016–17 season 
Samohin started his season off at the 2016 CS Autumn Classic International. he placed sixth overall. He then competed at the 2016 CS Finlandia Trophy where he finished thirteenth.
Making his Grand Prix debut, Samohin placed 5th at the 2016 Skate Canada International and 8th at the 2016 Cup of China. In December, he won the silver medal behind Oleksii Bychenko at the 2016 CS Golden Spin of Zagreb, having ranked first in the short program and 7th in the free skate.

Samohin's luggage containing his skates was mislaid by the airline and did not arrive with him at the 2017 European Championships in Ostrava, Czech Republic, so he tried a borrowed new pair of skates four hours before the short program. He placed 33rd in the short, and did not advance to the free skate. His skates were found two and a half weeks later. He ranked 16th in the short program, second in the free skate, and sixth overall at the 2017 World Junior Championships in Taipei, Taiwan. He said that he was working on additional quads – loop, flip, and Lutz – but that they were not yet consistent for him.

In March 2017 he won the bronze medal at the Cup of Tyrol in Innsbruck, Austria. He also won a bronze medal in the ISU CS Minsk Arena Ice Star 2017, in Minsk, Belarus.

2017–18 season 
Samohin withdrew from the 2017 Skate America in November 2017, after dislocating his left shoulder when he fell on a quad Salchow.

He competed for Israel at the 2018 Winter Olympics in Men's Singles Figure Skating in Pyeongchang, South Korea, at the age of 19. He came in 13th, with 251.44 points, additionally setting a personal best score of 170.75 in the free skate.

He finished 20th at Worlds after scoring 20th in the short program and 18th in the free skate.

2018–19 season 
Samohin started his season off at the 2018 CS Ondrej Nepela Trophy. Placing 7th in the short program and 6th in the free skate, he placed 6th overall, He then competed at the 2018 CS Nebelhorn Trophy where he finished 6th. He withdrew from the 2018 CS Finlandia Trophy. 
In his Grand Prix events, he placed 8th at 2018 Skate Canada International and 10th at 2018 Internationaux de France.

2019–20 season 
Samohin began the season with a fifth-place finish at the 2019 CS Nebelhorn Trophy, before placing tenth at the 2019 Internationaux de France.  Samohin withdrew from the 2019 Rostelecom Cup after placing eleventh in the short program, citing injury.  He won the silver medal at the Israeli championships, concluding his season.

2020–21 season 
With the coronavirus pandemic leading to the ISU assigning Grand Prix events based primarily on training location, Samohin was assigned to the 2020 Skate America following the withdrawal of Stephen Gogolev.  He placed twelfth of twelve skaters at the event.

2021–22 season 
Samohin began the international season with two minor events, a fifth place finish at the Skating Club of Boston's Cranberry Cup before coming in seventh at the 2021 U.S. International Classic. On the Challenger series, he placed eighteenth at the 2021 CS Cup of Austria and twenty-third at the 2021 CS Golden Spin of Zagreb.

Records and achievements
 Set the junior-level men's record for the free program to 165.38 points at the 2016 Junior Worlds, previously held by Shoma Uno.

Programs

Competitive highlights 
GP: Grand Prix; CS: Challenger Series; JGP: Junior Grand Prix

Detailed results 
Small medals for short and free programs awarded only at ISU Championships. At team events, medals awarded for team results only.

Junior level 
Small medals for short and free programs awarded only at ISU Championships. Previous ISU world best highlighted in bold.

Personal best highlighted in bold.

References

External links

 
 

1998 births
Living people
Sportspeople from Tel Aviv
Israeli male single skaters
Israeli people of Russian-Jewish descent
Figure skaters at the 2018 Winter Olympics
Olympic figure skaters of Israel
Jewish Israeli sportspeople
World Junior Figure Skating Championships medalists
Israeli expatriates in the United States